Krery may refer to the following places:
Krery, Łódź Voivodeship (central Poland)
Krery, Masovian Voivodeship (east-central Poland)
Krery, Pomeranian Voivodeship (north Poland)